In British politics, Blairism is the political ideology of Tony Blair, the former leader of the Labour Party and Prime Minister between 1997 and 2007, and those that support him, known as Blairites. It entered the New Penguin English Dictionary in 2000. Elements of the ideology include investment in public services, expansionary efforts in education to encourage social mobility, and increased actions in terms of mass surveillance alongside a ramping up of law enforcement powers, both of these latter changes advocated in the context of fighting organized crime and terrorism. Blarities have additionally been known for their contrast with the traditional support for socialism by those believing in left-wing politics, with Blair himself and others speaking out against the nationalisation of major industries and against also heavy regulations of business operations.

Ideology

Politically, Blair has been identified with record investment into public services, an interventionist and Atlanticist foreign policy, support for stronger law enforcement powers, a large focus on surveillance as a means to address terrorism and a large focus on education as a means to encourage social mobility. In the early years (circa 1994–1997), Blairism was also associated with support for European integration and particularly British participation in the European single currency, though this waned after Labour took office.

The term is used in particular in contrast to Brownite, to identify those within the Labour Party who supported Gordon Brown rather than Blair. However, with Blair and Brown typically in agreement on most political issues (from Iraq to public sector reform), some commentators have noted that "the difference between Brownites and Blairites [...] is more tribal than ideological". This is believed to stem from a personal disagreement between Blair and Brown over who should run for the leadership following the death of John Smith in 1994. Though Brown was originally considered the senior of the two, he waited until after Smith's funeral to begin campaigning, by which point Blair had gathered too much momentum to be defeated. However, in his book Whatever it Takes, Steve Richards offered an alternate view: that there were significant disagreements between the two about relative poverty, the level of public spending and the potential for choice in public services.

In a 1999 article, The Economist stated: 

Blair's tenure is known for an expansion of LGBT rights, such as the introduction of civil partnerships. Blair told the LGBT organisation Stonewall that "what has happened is that the culture of the country has changed in a definable way" and that "it's a thing that doesn't just give me a lot of pride, but it has actually brought a lot of joy". Blair has also stated that he got up off his seat and danced upon seeing the first civil partnership ceremonies on television.

Relationship to prior administrations

The Daily Telegraph stated in April 2008 that Blair's programme, with its emphasis on "New Labour", accepted the free-market ideology of Thatcherism. The article cited deregulation, privatisation of key national industries, maintaining a flexible labour market, marginalising the role of trade unions and devolving government decision making to local authorities as evidence. He also sought a closer, better relationship with Europe, and considered joining the Euro currency, but Gordon Brown was not in favour.

In the BBC Four documentary film Tory! Tory! Tory!, Blair is described as personally admiring Margaret Thatcher deeply and making the decision that she would be the first outside person he formally invited to visit him in 10 Downing Street.

Former Conservative Prime Minister John Major, who Blair defeated in a landslide at the 1997 general election; was one of the original figures behind the Northern Ireland peace process that Blair continued and both of them campaigned together in support of the Good Friday Agreement.

Blair privately called Thatcher "unhinged", a description that later became public knowledge. Blair criticised the Thatcher government's record on poverty and made that a key issue for Labour economic policy. He made the goal to eradicate child poverty in Britain within 20 years based on the fact that one-third of British children were in poverty post-Thatcher compared to the 9% rate in 1979 (although these statistics are disputed).

In a 2001 speech to a Conservative election rally, Thatcher called New Labour 'rootless and soulless' saying at least Old Labour stood for certain principles, that respected them, and also said Blair does not truly believe in liberty. She also claimed the Labour government would give up the British pound to join the Euro.

Blair also abolished Section 28 and created more pro-European initiatives compared to Thatcher.

In his 2010 autobiography, A Journey, Blair remarked:

Relationship to later administrations

Gordon Brown succeeded Blair as Prime Minister after Brown's long tenure as the Chancellor of the Exchequer. Although viewed in the media as somewhat personally close, Blair later wrote in his autobiography A Journey that a "maddening" Brown effectively blackmailed him while he was in 10 Downing Street. Blair accused Brown of orchestrating the investigation into the Cash-for-Honours scandal and stated that the personal animosity was so strong that it led him to frequent drinking, a big change for Blair. Blair also has told journalist Andrew Marr that as their years working together went on, co-operation become "hard going on impossible".

As stated before, both men had similar positions on actual issues and government policies. To the extent that they felt divided, it came mostly from differences in personality, background and managing style.

Impact on the Labour Party 
The Labour Party leadership of Jeremy Corbyn was seen as a departure from Blairism, and a return of Old Labour, and was described as a 'return of the 1940s Labour Party' by The Guardian, with its emphasis on re-nationalisation of energy, water, and railways and massive public investment in housing and the NHS. Jeremy Corbyn was critical of Blair's involvement in Iraq and voted against it at the time, garnering much support particularly from the youth vote. Labour increased its vote share by over 9% in 2017, costing Theresa May her majority in Parliament, but with the party split by Brexit policy and identitarian infighting, it lost the 2019 election to Boris Johnson's Conservatives.

Since the election of Keir Starmer as Leader of the Labour Party in 2020, some in the British media  have noted the ideological shift from the left back to the centre, allowing comparisons to be drawn between the current policy platform of the Labour Party and its Shadow Ministers (some of whom served in the cabinets of Blair and Brown) and that of New Labour.

The November 2021 shadow cabinet reshuffle was seen to be giving more power to Blairites in the Parliamentary Labour Party. This was criticised by former Shadow Chancellor of the Exchequer John McDonnell. In May 2022, on the 25th anniversary of Labour's landslide victory in the 1997 election, Blair in a video looked back at the victory and his achievements and showed his support for Starmer.

Blairites

Other than Blair himself, the following prominent Labour politicians are often considered Blairites, but may not identify themselves as such:

 Alastair Campbell – Blair's spokesman and campaign director (1994–1997), Downing Street Press Secretary and as the Prime Minister's Official Spokesperson (1997–2000), Downing Street Director of Communications and spokesman for the Labour Party (2000–2003). Campaign director for Blair's third election win in 2005.
 Andrew Adonis – former Shadow Minister for Infrastructure and Economic Delivery and former Transport Secretary
 Valerie Amos – Under-Secretary-General for Humanitarian Affairs and Emergency Relief Coordinator, British High Commissioner to Australia and the first black woman to serve in the Cabinet
 Hilary Armstrong – former Minister for the Cabinet Office and Chief Whip
 Hazel Blears – former Secretary of State for Communities and Local Government
 David Blunkett – former Home Secretary
 Stephen Byers – former Secretary of State for Transport, Local Government and the Regions and former MP
 Ben Bradshaw – former Culture Secretary
 Liam Byrne – former Shadow Work and Pensions Secretary.
 Charles Clarke – former Home Secretary and former MP who lost his seat at the 2010 general election
 Charles Falconer – former Lord Chancellor
 Caroline Flint – former Shadow Secretary of State for Energy and Climate Change
 Tom Harris – former MP
 Patricia Hewitt – former Secretary of State for Health and former MP
 Margaret Hodge – former chair of the Public accounts committee
 Geoff Hoon – former Secretary of State for Defence
 Tristram Hunt – former MP for Stoke-on-Trent Central
 Owen Smith – former MP for Pontypridd and Shadow Secretary of State for Northern Ireland.
 John Hutton – former Secretary of State for Defence, MP and head of a commission into public sector pensions for the Conservative-Liberal Democrat coalition
 Tessa Jowell – former Culture Secretary
 Alan Johnson – former Home Secretary
 Sally Keeble – former MP for Northampton North
 Ruth Kelly – former Cabinet minister and economist
 Liz Kendall – MP for Leicester West and 2015 Labour Party leadership candidate
 Oona King – Former MP for Bethnal Green and Bow who lost her seat to George Galloway and the defeated candidate to be Labour's candidate for the Mayoralty of London
 Peter Mandelson – former First Secretary of State and spin doctor
 Wes Streeting – Shadow Secretary of State for Health
 Alan Milburn – former Secretary of State for Health, MP and Social Mobility Tsar under the Conservative-Liberal Democrat coalition.
 David Miliband – former Foreign Secretary and defeated 2010 Labour Party leadership candidate
 Estelle Morris – former Secretary of State for Education and currently a peer
 Sally Morgan – former director of Government Relations, Minister for Women and chair of Ofsted
 Jim Murphy – former Secretary of State for Scotland and Leader of the Scottish Labour Party 2014–15.
 James Purnell – former Secretary of State for Work and Pensions
 John Reid – former Home Secretary
 Jacqui Smith – former Home Secretary

See also 

 Brownism
 Centrism in the United Kingdom
 Clintonism
 Thatcherism
 Third Way

Footnotes

Tony Blair
Politics of the United Kingdom
Eponymous political ideologies
New Labour
Political party factions in the United Kingdom
Centrism in the United Kingdom
Labour Party (UK) factions